Westbeth Artists Housing is a nonprofit housing and commercial complex dedicated to providing affordable living and working space for artists and arts organizations in New York City. The complex comprises the full city block bounded by West, Bethune, Washington and Bank Streets in the West Village neighborhood of Manhattan, New York City; the complex is named for the streets West and Bethune.

It occupies the Bell Laboratories Buildings, which were the headquarters of Bell Telephone Laboratories 1898–1966, before being converted in 1968–1970. That conversion was overseen by architect Richard Meier. This low- to moderate-income rental housing and commercial real estate project, the largest in the world of its type, was developed with the assistance of the J.M. Kaplan Fund and federal funds from the National Endowment for the Arts.

Westbeth is owned and operated by Westbeth Corp. Housing Development Fund Corp. Inc., a New York not-for-profit corporation governed by an unpaid, volunteer board of directors. , Westbeth has a very old population, including many original tenants – about 60% of tenants were over the age of 60 years, and about 30% were over the age of 70. It is thus a naturally occurring retirement community, and has an on-site social worker. Children of tenants are allowed to take over their parents' apartment, and thus there is a multi-generational community. Due to the 10–12-year waiting period for an apartment, Westbeth closed its residential waiting list in 2007. This changed on March 18, 2019 when the institution started accepting applications for an indefinite period of time.

History

Westbeth is among the first examples of adaptive reuse of industrial buildings for artistic and residential use in the United States. It is a complex of 13 buildings in Manhattan's West Village, which was originally part of the Bell Laboratories Building (1898–1966), one of the world's most important industrial research centers. The Bell Labs building was home to many inventions, including the vacuum tube, the condenser microphone, an early version of television, and the transistor. The complex was vacated by Bell Labs in the middle 1960s, and remained empty until the Westbeth project started later in the decade. Using seed money from the J.M. Kaplan Fund and help and encouragement from the National Council for the Arts (which has since become the National Endowment for the Arts), an ambitious renovation project designed to create live-work spaces for 384 artists of all disciplines was initiated under the direction of developer Dixon Bain. The project was the first significant public commission of Richard Meier. Westbeth opened in 1970 for artists, dancers, musicians, actors, writers and film makers.

Artists of all disciplines are admitted as tenants in Westbeth after review by a committee of residential tenants in their discipline. They must also meet certain income requirements at the time of admission. (The waiting list for new residential tenants was closed in 2007.) As of 2014, residential tenants paid an average of $800 a month in rent, including electricity, approximately one-third to one-quarter the market rate for comparable space.

In addition to its residential component, there are also large and small commercial spaces, performance spaces, and rehearsal and artists' studios. Westbeth is home to a number of major cultural organizations, including The New School for Drama, the LAByrinth Theater Company, the Martha Graham Center of Contemporary Dance, and Congregation Beit Simchat Torah, the first LGBT synagogue in New York and the largest in the world, with more than 800 members. The space occupied by The New School was previously occupied by an Off-Broadway theatre.

Westbeth was added to the National Register of Historic Places on December 8, 2009, after the Greenwich Village Society for Historic Preservation (GVSHP), using funds from the J.M. Kaplan Fund, commissioned historic preservationist Andrew Dolkart to write a nominating report to list Westbeth on the State and National Register of Historic Places. The research included interviews with several key figures in the conversion of the former Bell Telephone Labs to the nation's first subsidized housing complex for artists, including architect Richard Meier, choreographer Merce Cunningham, and Joan Davidson, the daughter of J.M. Kaplan who coordinated the founding of Westbeth. Following Prof. Dolkart's submission, and citing the "extraordinary significance" required to list sites on the State and National Register of Historic Places which are less than 50 years old, the New York State Historic Preservation Board unanimously approved the nomination of Westbeth to the State Register of Historic Places.

As part of an effort to extend landmark protections to the Far West Village, GVSHP spearheaded a campaign to have the New York City Landmarks Preservation Commission (LPC) designate the entire complex as an individual landmark. In response, the LPC committed to do so in 2004 as part of a broader series of landmark designations it agreed to do in the area. It was not until 2009, however, that the LPC took the formal step of "calendaring" the complex for a hearing and issuing a "Statement of Significance". GVSHP urged the LPC to act before the end of 2010, the 40th anniversary of the complex's conversion to artists’ housing. On October 25, 2011, Westbeth was designated a landmark by the LPC.

Organizations

The Westbeth Artists' Residents Council, elected by the residential tenants, acts as the building's tenants association and provides cultural events to the public such as readings, performances, and film screenings in the Westbeth Community Performance Space and runs the Westbeth Art Gallery, which exhibits the work of both resident and non-resident artists; both in spaces donated by the corporation. The council receives public funding from the NYC Department of Cultural Affairs. In 2008, the council was awarded a major grant from the Pollock-Krasner Foundation for the council's official website. The website hosts individual artists' pages showing the work of its artist-residents and publicizes cultural events and exhibitions sponsored by the council. The council also functions as the tenants association, and is involved in various larger community issues, particularly with regard to preserving the historic character of the West Village neighborhood, and zoning issues.

Notable people

Westbeth Artists Housing has been home to a number of influential artists, musicians and performers including Diane Arbus – whose suicide in 1971 caused a stir in the young community – Robert Beauchamp, Barton Lidice Benes, Paul Benjamin, Karl Bissinger, Barnaby Ruhe, Black-Eyed Susan, Joseph Chaikin, David Del Tredici, Robert De Niro Sr., Vin Diesel, John Dobbs, Gil Evans, David Greenspan, Moses Gunn, director Tod Culpan Williams and his sister, former supermodel Rachel Williams, Hans Haacke, Billy Harper, Spencer Holst, Irv Teibel, Gayle Kirschenbaum, Anita Kushner, Ralph Lee, Hal Miller, Herman Rose, Barbara Rosenthal, Muriel Rukeyser, Ed Sanders, Tobias Schneebaum and Anne Tabachnick.

Merce Cunningham, the noted choreographer and dancer, had his studio and offices at Westbeth for more than 40 years, from 1971 up to the time of his death and the dissolution of the Merce Cunningham Dance Company in 2012.

Edward Field and his partner Neil Derrick, co-authors of The Villagers, lived together at Westbeth. As of February 2018, Field continued to live at Westbeth and was considered one of its Icons.

Jean-Marie Haessle and his ex-wife Lucienne Weinberger were among the first residents of Westbeth. They lived there together for a couple years. Lucienne still lives there until today.

One of the first feminist theater groups in the country, the Westbeth Playwrights Feminist Collective, originated here.

The film Growing Up At Westbeth by Christina Maile and Francia Tobacman Smith features archival photos, footage and interviews, 40 years later, with the children who grew up at Westbeth. The film was shown at the 40th Anniversary Celebration of Westbeth in October 2010 as part of the Westbeth Film Festival. A film about the noted feminist artist Anita Steckel, a resident of Westbeth, is in production by the same filmmakers. "Harry's Gift, A New York Story," is a 2015 documentary by Alexandra M. Isles about Harry Schunk, a photographer and long-time Westbeth tenant, and the man who cleaned out his apartment after his death.

The feature documentary Winter at Westbeth by Rohan Spong charts one year (2014–2015) in the life of the building and spotlights three long-term residents: filmmaker Edith Stephen, poet Ilsa Gilbert and notable contemporary dancer Dudley Williams of Martha Graham and Alvin Ailey fame. It had its world premiere in 2016 at the 60th Sydney Film Festival. The film then had its international premiere at IFC Center, where it screened in competition as part of Doc NYC, ultimately receiving a Special Jury Mention. It has since screened at the US Library of Congress.

Westbeth is just over 2 miles north of the World Trade Center, and many of its artists witnessed from its roof the events of 9/11. Westbeth artist, writer and film maker Jacqui Taylor Basker with African-American opera singer Salvador Peter Tomas, made a film about how 9/11 impacted Westbeth and New York City artists, edited by Ernie Mortuzans, Aftermath 9/11 and New York Artists.

Notable current and past artists-in-residence include:
 Jelon Vieira – artistic director
 Edward Field – poet
 Peter Bernstein – jazz guitarist
 Valerie Ghent – musician, singer, songwriter, producer
 David Greenspan – actor, playwright, director
 Madeleine Yayodele Nelson – musician
 Nasheet Waits – drummer
 Hugh Seidman – poet

See also
 Paul Abels

References

External links

Westbeth Artists Residents Council official website
Westbeth Center for the Arts official company website
Westbeth: Home of the Arts movie clip

Westbeth Oral Histories: project manager Dixon Bain; NEA official Ana Steele Clark; Westbeth executive director Peter Cott; choreographer Merce Cunningham; project coordinator Joan Davidson; architect Richard Meier; architect Tod Williams. Greenwich Village Society for Historic Preservation

American artist groups and collectives
Buildings and structures on the National Register of Historic Places in Manhattan
Richard Meier buildings
West Village
New York City Designated Landmarks in Manhattan